Provincial electoral districts in Nova Scotia.

Present Districts
 Annapolis (1993–present)
 Antigonish (1867–present)
 Argyle (1981–present)
 Bedford South (2021–present)
 Bedford Basin (2021–present)
 Cape Breton Centre (1925–present)
 Cape Breton North (1933–present)
 Cape Breton Nova (1956–present)
 Cape Breton South (1933–present)
 Cape Breton West (1933–present)
 Chester-St. Margaret's (1993–present)
 Clare (1949–present)
 Colchester North (1978–present)
 Colchester-Musquodoboit Valley (1993–present)
 Cole Harbour (1978–1993) (2003–present)
 Cole Harbour-Eastern Passage (1993–present)
 Cumberland North (1993–present)
 Cumberland South (1993–present)
 Dartmouth East (1978–present)
 Dartmouth North (1967–present)
 Dartmouth South-Portland Valley (2003–present)
 Digby-Annapolis (1993–present)
 Eastern Shore (1993–present)
 Glace Bay (2003–present)
 Guysborough-Sheet Harbour (1993–present)
 Halifax Atlantic (1967–present)
 Halifax Chebucto (1933–present)
 Halifax Citadel (1933–present)
 Halifax Clayton Park (2003–present)
 Halifax Fairview (1993–present)
 Halifax Needham (1967–present)
 Hammonds Plains-Lucasville (2013–present)
 Hants East (1949–present)
 Hants West (1949–present)
 Inverness (1867–1981) (1993–present)
 Kings North (1956–present)
 Kings South (1956–present)
 Kings West (1956–present)
 Lunenburg (1867–1956) (1993–present)
 Lunenburg West (1956–present)
 Pictou Centre (1949–present)
 Pictou East (1949–present)
 Pictou West (1949–present)
 Preston (1993–present)
 Queens (1867–present)
 Richmond (1867–1925) (1933–present)
 Sackville-Cobequid (1993–present)
 Shelburne (1867–present)
 Timberlea-Prospect (1993–present)
 Truro-Bible Hill-Millbrook-Salmon River (1978–present)
 Victoria-The Lakes (2003–present)
 Waverley-Fall River-Beaverbank (2003–present)
 Yarmouth (1867–present)

Historical Districts

Redistributed in 2021
 Bedford (2003–2021)

Redistributed in 2003
 Cape Breton East (1925–2003)
 Cape Breton The Lakes (1978–2003)
 Dartmouth South (1967–2003)
 Dartmouth-Cole Harbour (1993–2003)
 Halifax Bedford Basin (1978–2003)
 Sackville-Beaver Bank (1993–2003)
 Victoria (1867–2003)

Redistributed in 1993
 Annapolis East (1956–1993)
 Annapolis West (1956–1993)
 Colchester South (1978–1993)
 Cumberland Centre (1949–1993)
 Cumberland East (1949–1993)
 Cumberland West (1949–1993)
 Digby (1867–1993)
 Guysborough (1867–1993)
 Halifax Cornwallis (1967–1993)
 Halifax Eastern Shore (1967–1993)
 Halifax St. Margarets (1967–1993)
 Inverness North (1981–1993)
 Inverness South (1981–1993)
 Lunenburg Centre (1956–1993)
 Lunenburg East (1956–1993)
 Sackville (1978–1993)

Redistributed in 1978
 Colchester (1867–1978)
 Halifax Cobequid (1967–1978)

Redistributed in 1967
 Halifax Centre (1933–1967)
 Halifax County Dartmouth (1956–1967)
 Halifax East (1933–1967)
 Halifax North (1933–1967)
 Halifax Northwest (1956–1967)
 Halifax South (1933–1967)
 Halifax West (1933–1967)

Redistributed in 1956
 Kings (1867–1956)
 Annapolis County (1867–1956)

Redistributed in 1949
 Cumberland (1867–1949)
 Hants (1867–1949)
 Pictou (1867–1949)

Redistributed in 1933
 Halifax (1867–1933)
 Richmond and Cape Breton West (1925–1933)

Redistributed in 1925
 Cape Breton (1867–1925)

See also
 List of Nova Scotia General Assemblies

Electoral districts
Nova Scotia